Nicholls House and Woolen Mill Site is a historic home and mill site located near Wellsburg, Brooke County, West Virginia. The house was built in 1893, and is a -story, red-glazed brick building in the Second Empire style.  It has a tower and mansard roof.  It features a full front porch with Doric order columns in the Colonial Revival style.  The property also includes the site of a mill used for carding and manufacturing woolens dating to 1795.

It was listed on the National Register of Historic Places in 1997.

References

Houses on the National Register of Historic Places in West Virginia
Archaeological sites on the National Register of Historic Places in West Virginia
Second Empire architecture in West Virginia
Houses completed in 1893
Houses in Brooke County, West Virginia
National Register of Historic Places in Brooke County, West Virginia